Craig Ross (born 18 October 1970) is a New Zealand cricketer. He played in seventeen first-class and ten List A matches for Northern Districts from 1989 to 1997.

See also
 List of Northern Districts representative cricketers

References

External links
 

1970 births
Living people
New Zealand cricketers
Northern Districts cricketers
People from Papakura